The 1968–69 New York Knicks season was the 23rd season for the team in the National Basketball Association (NBA). The Knicks finished third in the Eastern Division with a 54–28 regular season record, and qualified for the NBA Playoffs for the third straight year. In the first round of the playoffs, New York defeated the Baltimore Bullets in a four-game sweep to earn a berth in the Eastern Division Finals. The Knicks lost the division finals to the eventual NBA champion Boston Celtics in six games. Willis Reed scored a team-best 21.1 points per game for the Knicks; Walt Frazier led the team with 7.9 assists per game and Reed averaged 14.5 rebounds per game.

The Knicks selected Bill Hosket, Jr. in the opening round of the 1968 NBA draft, and made a significant trade early in the season, acquiring Dave DeBusschere from the Detroit Pistons in exchange for Walt Bellamy and Butch Komives. Author Harvey Araton called him "the player who would complete the championship puzzle in New York." After a 5–11 start to the season, New York went on a long winning streak, winning all but 2 of 19 games in one stretch that included 13 straight home wins. After a two-game losing streak, the Knicks won 11 consecutive games from January 25 to February 15 to bring their record to 44–21. The Knicks had two four-game winning streaks during the rest of the season, and ended with a 54–28 record. This mark placed them third in the Eastern Conference; only the Bullets and Philadelphia 76ers had superior records. New York saw an increase in attendance during the regular season; after having six sellouts in their entire history, the Knicks played to capacity crowds in 14 games at Madison Square Garden.

New York faced the Bullets, who had won 57 games in the regular season and held the number one seed in the Eastern Conference, in their first playoff round. The Knicks won the first two games by over 10 points each, and a pair of closer victories in games three and four eliminated Baltimore. They held home court advantage for their series with the Celtics, but lost it with a 108–100 loss in the first game. After losing two of the next three games, New York won game five to force a sixth game. However, Boston's Sam Jones posted 29 points to help the Celtics to a 106–105 win that ended the Knicks' season.

NBA Draft

Note: This is not an extensive list; it only covers the first and second rounds, and any other players picked by the franchise that played at least one game in the league.

Roster

Regular season

Season standings

x – clinched playoff spot

Record vs. opponents

Game log

Playoffs

|- align="center" bgcolor="#ccffcc"
| 1
| March 27
| @ Baltimore
| W 113–101
| Walt Frazier (26)
| Dave DeBusschere (21)
| Walt Frazier (11)
| Baltimore Civic Center11,941
| 1–0
|- align="center" bgcolor="#ccffcc"
| 2
| March 29
| Baltimore
| W 107–91
| Dick Barnett (27)
| Dave DeBusschere (19)
| Walt Frazier (12)
| Madison Square Garden19,500
| 2–0
|- align="center" bgcolor="#ccffcc"
| 3
| March 30
| @ Baltimore
| W 119–116
| Willis Reed (35)
| Willis Reed (19)
| Walt Frazier (17)
| Baltimore Civic Center9,927
| 3–0
|- align="center" bgcolor="#ccffcc"
| 4
| April 2
| Baltimore
| W 115–108
| Willis Reed (43)
| Willis Reed (17)
| Walt Frazier (11)
| Madison Square Garden19,500
| 4–0
|-

|- align="center" bgcolor="#ffcccc"
| 1
| April 6
| Boston
| L 100–108
| Walt Frazier (34)
| Dave DeBusschere (14)
| Walt Frazier (8)
| Madison Square Garden19,500
| 0–1
|- align="center" bgcolor="#ffcccc"
| 2
| April 9
| @ Boston
| L 97–112
| Willis Reed (28)
| Willis Reed (13)
| Walt Frazier (4)
| Boston Garden14,933
| 0–2
|- align="center" bgcolor="#ccffcc"
| 3
| April 10
| Boston
| W 101–91
| Walt Frazier (26)
| Willis Reed (14)
| Walt Frazier (12)
| Madison Square Garden19,500
| 1–2
|- align="center" bgcolor="#ffcccc"
| 4
| April 13
| @ Boston
| L 96–97
| Willis Reed (22)
| Willis Reed (19)
| Walt Frazier (6)
| Boston Garden13,506
| 1–3
|- align="center" bgcolor="#ccffcc"
| 5
| April 14
| Boston
| W 112–104
| Willis Reed (24)
| Walt Frazier (12)
| Walt Frazier (9)
| Madison Square Garden19,500
| 2–3
|- align="center" bgcolor="#ffcccc"
| 6
| April 18
| @ Boston
| L 105–106
| Willis Reed (32)
| Willis Reed (11)
| Bill Bradley (7)
| Boston Garden14,933
| 2–4
|-

Awards and records
Willis Reed, All-NBA Second Team
Dave DeBusschere, All-NBA Second Team
Walt Frazier, NBA All-Defensive First Team
Dave DeBusschere, NBA All-Defensive First Team

References

Bibliography

New York
New York Knicks seasons
New York Knicks
New York Knicks
1960s in Manhattan
Madison Square Garden